The Arlington Resort Hotel & Spa is a resort in the Ouachita Mountains of Hot Springs National Park, Arkansas, home of Oaklawn Race Track and the Arkansas Derby. The Arlington's design inspired the Baker Hotel in Mineral Wells, Texas. The hotel is located at the north end of "Bathhouse Row".

History

Samuel W. Fordyce and two other entrepreneurs financed the construction of the first luxury hotel in the area, the first Arlington Hotel, which opened in 1875. After almost 20 years of use, it was razed to build a new hotel.

When it was rebuilt in 1892–93, the hotel was known as the New Arlington, and boasted of its Spanish Renaissance architecture.  With 300 rooms in four stories of red brick, it had corner towers.  This second Arlington burned to the ground on April 5, 1923, killing one fireman and causing an estimated $1.6 million in damage (1923 dollars, about $23.5M in 2018 dollars).

Those buildings were at the north end of Bathhouse Row, where the Arlington Park then was created.  The third Arlington Hotel, designed by Mann and Stern in 1924, is the current hotel at the "Y" intersection at the corner of Central Avenue and Fountain Street.  The building's huge size, Spanish-Colonial Revival style, and placement at the terminus of the town's most important vista made the building a key Hot Springs landmark.  The original site became a park at the north end of Bathhouse Row.

In the 1930s, the Arlington Hotel was a favorite vacation spot for Al Capone at room 443. The whole floor was even rented out for his staff and bodyguards.

Many famous people including the U.S. presidents Franklin Roosevelt, Harry Truman, George H.W. Bush, and native son Bill Clinton have stayed. Even baseball legend Babe Ruth and Tony Bennett, Barbra Streisand and Yoko Ono have all luxuriated at the hotel.

For 30 years the hotel was air conditioned via windows and door louvers until 1955 when the central heating & air was installed. The three guests elevators, in operation since 1969 replaced the original elevators that were installed in 1924. The original bath house elevator – lined with beveled glass and shining brass still exists and still manually operates.

The Arlington Hotel has a history of luxury and class, a prime example of all the vast celebrities that have come to it.  it was even referred to as “the most elegant and complete hotel in America” in Charles Cutter's 1892 Guide Book.

The Lobby Bar of the Arlington is on Esquire Magazine's list of the best bars in America.

Hauntings 
The hotel is said to be one of the most haunted building in Bathhouse Row. Over the years, guests of the hotel have reported countless paranormal sightings. Room 667 (previously named Room 666) is believed to be haunted by a guest who have committed suicide during the mid 1950s. At  room 824, guests of the hotel claimed that their personal belongings would be moved around. The piano at the hotel's lobby bar is known to play by itself after midnight.

References

External links

Official Site

Hotel buildings on the National Register of Historic Places in Arkansas
1875 establishments in Arkansas
1925 establishments in Arkansas
Buildings and structures in Hot Springs, Arkansas
Tourist attractions in Garland County, Arkansas
Historic district contributing properties in Arkansas
Hotels established in 1875
National Register of Historic Places in Hot Springs, Arkansas
Hot Springs, Arkansas